The Other is the fourth studio album by American musician King Tuff. It was released on April 13, 2018, under Sub Pop.

Critical reception
The Other was met with "generally favorable" reviews from critics. At Metacritic, which assigns a weighted average rating out of 100 to reviews from mainstream publications, this release received an average score of 75, based on 9 reviews. Aggregator Album of the Year gave the release a 68 out of 100 based on a critical consensus of 11 reviews.

Track listing

Personnel
Kyle Thomas - vocals, bass, guitars, Wurlitzer, synthesizers, autoharp, organ, percussion
Ty Segall - drums on tracks 2, 4–7, 9, 10, backing vocals on track 5
Charles Moothart - drums on track 3
Mikal Cronin - alto & baritone saxophones on tracks 2, 6
Jenny Lewis - backing vocals on tracks 3, 4
Greta Morgan - backing vocals on tracks 3, 4
Kevin Morby - backing vocals on track 5

References

2018 albums
Sub Pop albums
King Tuff albums